MindaNews is an online newspaper based in Mindanao, in the Philippines. It is owned by Mindanao News and Information Cooperative Center (MNICC). The regional newspaper is circulated Mindanao-wide.

References

External links
MindaNews official website
 Citizens' Peace Watch Fact-Finding Mission to Zamboanga City and Sulu
 Hollywood heartthrob Josh Hartnett to shoot "I Come With The Rain" in Mindanao
 How to kill a priest: The Norberto Manero story

Asian news websites
Newspapers published in Davao City